Brune was a  30-gun frigate of the French Navy. She took part in the naval battles of the Seven Year War, and was captured by the British. Recommissioned in the Royal Navy as the 32-gun HMS Brune, she served until 1792.

Career 

Brune was ordered in January 1753, and named on 7 January 1753. In 1757, she served in a squadron under Rear-admiral Beaufremont to ferry troops to Saint-Domingue.

She served as a coast-guard until August 1758, when she was decommissioned.

On 18 March, she was recommissioned in Brest.

Recommissioned in the Royal Navy as HMS Brune, she captured the French frigate  on 23 October 1762.

In 1780, she captured a French ship Renard

She was sold on 2 October 1792.

Notes and references

Notes

References

Bibliography

External links
 

Age of Sail frigates of France
Blonde-class frigates
Ships built in France
1756 ships
Captured ships